is a Japanese manga series written and illustrated by Takeshi Okazaki.

The manga was adapted into an animated movie, which was released by AIC in Japan and Dybex in France on April 1, 1995. The movie was licensed by Dybex but the license is now discontinued.

Plot 
Elementalors are humans with the power to control the forces of nature. They are also needed to balance those forces so that everything stays in harmony. As Lord Shiki, who has the power of water, is kidnapping Asami to try and release his imprisoned daughter. Kagura realizes that he also has the power of the Elementalors, so he joins forces with others to rescue Asami and stop Lord Shiki rescue plan.

Reception
Elementalors received the "Excellence Prize" in the manga category at the 1997 Japan Media Arts Festival.

References

External links

Dybex Elementalors movie website  

1989 manga
1995 anime films
Action anime and manga
Adventure anime and manga
Anime International Company
Fantasy anime and manga
Japanese animated films
Kadokawa Shoten manga
Kadokawa Dwango franchises
Manga adapted into films
Shōnen manga
Supernatural anime and manga